The Minnesota Department of Public Safety (DPS) is a department of the State of Minnesota in the United States. DPS is an enforcement, licensing and services agency that develops and operates programs in the areas of law enforcement, traffic safety, alcohol and gambling, fire safety, driver licensing, vehicle registration, emergency management and public safety information. The department coordinates the functions and services of the state relating to the safety and convenience of its citizens.

History

The Minnesota Department of Public Safety was established in 1969 per Minnesota Statute 299a. The State Highway Patrol and Drivers License Bureau, both formerly a part of the Minnesota Highway Department, were transferred to DPS in 1970.

The Minnesota Department of Public Safety is a large and complex agency dedicated to prevention, preparedness, response, recovery, enforcement and education.

The various divisions serve Minnesotans with programs in:

 Law enforcement
 Fire code development, fire investigation and safety inspection
 Forensic science
 Crime and fraud prevention
 Crime victims’ services
 Homeland security and emergency management
 Emergency communications network management
 Traffic and motorcycle safety
 Driver licensing and vehicle registration
 Alcohol and gambling enforcement
 Pipeline safety and rule enforcement
 Public safety education

Commissioner of Public Safety
The department is led by the Commissioner of Public Safety, who is appointed by and reports directly to the Governor of Minnesota. Below is a list of the Public Safety Commissioners since it was formed:   
 Jan 1970-Dec 1973: Wallace Hoaglund (1910-1995)
 June 1974-May 1979: Edward Novak (1917-2002)   
 May 1979-Sep 1982: John Sopsic (1940-2013)   
 Sep 1982-Dec 1982: Kenneth Dirkzwager (1919-2014)  
 Jan 1983-Jan 1991: Paul Tschida    
 Jan 1991-Oct 1991: Ralph Church   
 Oct 1991-Dec 1992: Thomas Frost   
 Dec 1992-Apr 1996: Michael Jordan   
 Apr 1996-Dec 1998: Don Davis   
 Jan 1999-Nov 2002: Charlie Weaver (1957-)   
 Jan 2003-Apr 2004: Rich Stanek (1962-)
 Apr 2004-Feb 2011: Michael Campion   
 Mar 2011–Jan 2019: Mona Dohman (1962-)
 Jan 2019-Jan-2023:  John Harrington https://en.wikipedia.org/wiki/John_Harrington_(American_politician)
 Jan 2023–present: Bob Jacobson

Divisions 
 Alcohol and Gambling Enforcement
 Bureau of Criminal Apprehension
 Commissioner's Office
 Driver and Vehicle Services
 Emergency Communication Networks
 Fiscal and Administrative Services
 Homeland Security and Emergency Management
 Human Resources
 Office of Communications
 Office of Justice Programs
 Office of Pipeline Safety
 Office of Traffic Safety
 State Fire Marshal
 Minnesota State Patrol

Agency leadership 
CommissionerJohn Harrington
Cassandra O'Hern, Deputy Commissioner 
Tom Smith, Assistant Commissioner
Tim Lynaugh, Assistant Commissioner

References

External links
 

State law enforcement agencies of Minnesota
1969 establishments in Minnesota
Government agencies established in 1969